The List may refer to:

 The List (2007 film), a film based on the novel by Robert Whitlow
 The List (2012 film), a documentary film about Kirk Johnson's efforts to rescue and settle Iraqi allies
 The List (2018 film), a comedy-drama film by Tyler Perry
 "The List" (Camp Lazlo), an episode of the television show Camp Lazlo
 "The List" (South Park), an episode of the television show South Park
 "The List" (The Office), an episode of the television show The Office
 "The List" (The X-Files), an episode of the television show The X-Files
 "The List" (The Amazing World of Gumball), an episode of the television show The Amazing World of Gumball
 The List (album), an album by Rosanne Cash
 The List (magazine), a Scottish magazine
 The List (Canadian TV series), a Canadian reality television series

See also
 List (disambiguation)